The Israeli Computer and IT Directorate (Agaf Ha-Tikshuv VeHaHagana BiSvivat Reshet) is the Israel Defense Forces body which charts the communication, wireless transmission, computerization, command and control over and defense of military and intelligence information in the IDF. The Directorate was created on March 3, 2003, on the basis of some functions previously held by the C4I Corps. The Directorate is also responsible for Cyber Defense in the IDF, a fact which has led to the name of the Directorate being changed to "Computer and IT Directorate" in May 2017.

Units

Lotem lists the following units:
 Mamram (ממר"ם) – Center of Computers and Information Systems – responsible for managing military software and computer infrastructure.
 Hoshen (חושן) – responsible for operating the army's communication systems.
 Ma'of (מעו"ף) – Systems and Projects – responsible for planning and engineering telecommunication systems.
 Matzpen (מצפ"ן) – Military Systems for Command and Control and management of logistics and human resources. The army's biggest software house that consists of the unification of Leshem (לשם) and Shoham (שהם) units.

Commanders
Aluf Yitzhak Harel (March 30, 2003 – December 20, 2003)
Aluf Udi Shani (December 21, 2003 – November 12, 2006)
Aluf Ami Shafran (November 13, 2006 – October 24, 2011)
Aluf  (October 24, 2011 – March 28, 2016)
Aluf Nadav Padan (June 13, 2016 – February 4, 2018)
Aluf Lior Carmeli (February 4, 2018 - January 19, 2022)
Aluf  (January 19, 2002 -)

References

Military units and formations of Israel
Israel Defense Forces directorates